Foster and West Geer Streets Historic District, also known as the West End, is a national historic district located at Durham, Durham County, North Carolina. The district encompasses 32 contributing buildings, 1 contributing site, and 4 contributing structures in a commercial section of Durham. The buildings primarily date between about 1927 and 1963 and include notable examples of Moderne, Colonial Revival, and Mission Revival architecture.  Located in the district are the separately listed City Garage Yard and Fire Drill Tower and Scott and Roberts Dry Cleaning Plant, Office, and Store. Other notable contributing resources include R. J. Reynolds Tobacco Company warehouse (1938), the Durham Baking Company (1938), Durham Bulls baseball team ballpark (1939), Fletcher's Service Station (c. 1946), U.S. Naval Reserve Training Center (1948, c. 1955), Uzzle Motor Company (1940, c. 1948, c. 1970), King's Sandwich Shop (1950), and Royal Crown and Seven-Up Bottling Company (1939).

It was listed on the National Register of Historic Places in 2013.

References

Historic districts on the National Register of Historic Places in North Carolina
Moderne architecture in North Carolina
Colonial Revival architecture in North Carolina
Mission Revival architecture in North Carolina
Historic districts in Durham, North Carolina
National Register of Historic Places in Durham County, North Carolina
Neighborhoods in Durham, North Carolina